Self-Portrait at the Age of 34 is a self-portrait by Rembrandt, dating to 1640 and now in the National Gallery in London. The painting is one of many self-portraits by Rembrandt, in both painting and etching, to show the artist in a fancy costume from the previous century.  In this case specific influences in the pose have long been recognised from Raphael's Portrait of Baldassare Castiglione (now Louvre) and Titian's A Man with a Quilted Sleeve (in 2017 called Portrait of Gerolamo?  Barbarigo) in the National Gallery.  Rembrandt saw both of these in Amsterdam, in his day the centre of Europe's art trade, and made a sketch of the Raphael, with its price.

He had tried out a similar pose in an etching of 1639, Self Portrait, Leaning on a Stone Wall (B21), looking rather more rakish.

The artist depicted himself at the height of his career, richly dressed and  self-secure. It is one of over forty painted self-portraits by Rembrandt.

Painting materials
The scientific analysis of this painting by the scientists at the National Gallery in London revealed the use of the following pigments by Rembrandt: lead white, bone black, charcoal black, ochres and vermilion.

References

 White, Christopher, Buvelot, Quentin (eds), Rembrandt by himself, 1999, National Gallery, London/Mauritshuis, The Hague,

External links
 
 http://www.nationalgallery.org.uk/paintings/rembrandt-self-portrait-at-the-age-of-34
 Rembrandt, Self-Portrait at the Age of 34, ColourLex

1640 paintings
Self-portraits by Rembrandt
Collections of the National Gallery, London